Nacer Bennemra (born 12 June 1989, in Zéralda) is an Algerian footballer. He is currently unattached.

Personal
Bennemra was born on 12 June 1989 in Zéralda. In 1996 he moved with his family to France.

Club career
Bennemra began playing at a young in age in Cournon. At age 13, he joined Clermont Foot and remained at the club for six years. However, in 2009, he left Clermont and signed with Championnat National side FC Gueugnon.

On 28 January 2011 Bennemra signed a two-year contract with Algerian club USM Blida.

International career
On 14 May 2010 Bennemra was called up to the Algerian Under-23 National Team by coach Abdelhak Benchikha for a 10-day training camp in Italy. The camp included a match against a local club, which was won 4-0 by the Algerian Under-23 side with a goal from Bennemra in the second half.

References

External links
 DZFoot Profile
 

1989 births
Living people
Footballers from Algiers
Algerian footballers
Algerian Ligue Professionnelle 1 players
Algerian emigrants to France
Clermont Foot players
FC Gueugnon players
USM Blida players
Expatriate footballers in France
Algeria under-23 international footballers
Association football midfielders